The House of Obertenghi were a prominent Italian noble family of Frankish origin descended from Viscount Adalbert III, first Margrave of Milan. 

The family held the titles of Marquis of Milan and Genoa, Count of Luni, Tortona, Genoa and Milan and regent of the March that took the family's name in the 10th century, the "Marca Obertenga", which encompassed most of the territories of present-day Northwest Italy and parts of Switzerland.

The dynasty is the progenitor of the widely powerful and prestigious House of Este, as well the House of Welf, parent house of the Hanover dynasty. Other cadet lines includes the Malaspina and Pallavicini families.

Origins

Early in 951, Berengar II of Italy finished the reorganisation of the Italian feudal structure begun by his predecessor Hugh. He named three new margraves to three new territories: 

Arduin Glaber was elevated from count to margrave of Turin (Torino, Ivrea, Maritime Alps, Nice, Ventimiglia, Sanremo); the Marca Arduinica or mark of the Arduinici.
Aleramo, Marquis of Montferrat, he named margrave of Western Liguria (Vercelli, Monferrato, Ceva, Acqui Terme, Oneglia, Albenga); the Marca Aleramica or mark of the Aleramici.
Oberto I margrave of Milan and count of Luni (Milan and Eastern Liguria at this time contained the counties of Genoa, Luni, Tortona, Bobbio, Piacenza and Parma); the Marca Obertenga or mark of the Obertenghi.

Family tree

Family heads
 940951: Adalbert III, (Regent) Margrave of Milan  Frankish noble, reputed son of Guy, Margrave of Tuscany.
 951975: Otbert I, Margrave of Milan, Count of Genoa  son of Adalbert; forefather of the dynasty, which name took from.
 9751002: Adalbert IV, Margrave of Milan, Count of Genoa  first-born son of Otbert I; grandfather of Adalbert II Pelavicino, founder of the Pallavicini family.
 10021014: Otbert II, Margrave of Milan, Count of Genoa  second-born son of Otbert I; deposed and imprisoned by Emperor Henry II due to his support for Arduin of Ivrea. Father of Obizzo I (third-born son), forefather of the Malaspina family.
 10141024: Hugh, Margrave of Milan, Count of Genoa  first-born son of Odbert II. Appointed by Emperor Henry II, he fell out after his death. Died childless.
 10241029: Albert Azzo I, Margrave of Milan, Count of Genoa  second-born son of Odbert II. First marquis of Este in 1011.
 10291097: Albert Azzo II, Margrave of Milan, Count of Genoa  son of Albert Azzo. Last of the Obertenghi main branch. Succeeded by:
 From his marriage with Kunigunde of Altdorf, Welf I, founder of the Younger House of Welf.
 From his marriage with Gersende, Countess of Maine, Faulk I, still Margrave of Milan and founder of the House of Este.
 Another son with Gersende, Hugh V, inherited the County of Maine, dying childless.

See also
 Kingdom of Italy (Holy Roman Empire)

References

Italian noble families